John Powell Royall (June 2, 1874 – August 14, 1945) was an American lawyer and politician who served as a member of the Virginia Senate, representing the state's 3rd district from 1912 to 1920. He was selected as the Republican nominee for Lieutenant Governor of Virginia in 1933 and Governor of Virginia in 1937, losing both times in the general election to former state delegate James Hubert Price.

Royall's wife, Jennie McDonald Bowen came from a prominent Southwest Virginia political family. Her paternal grandfather, Rees Tate Bowen, and uncle, Henry Bowen, both served in the United States House of Representatives.

Electoral history

References

External links
 
 

1874 births
1945 deaths
Republican Party members of the Virginia House of Delegates
Republican Party Virginia state senators
Washington and Lee University alumni
Politicians from Danville, Virginia
20th-century American politicians